Midwest Communications is a Wausau, Wisconsin-based radio broadcasting company. It owns 82 radio stations located primarily within the Midwest United States, in Indiana, Michigan, Minnesota, North Dakota, South Dakota, Tennessee, Illinois and Wisconsin. The company is a family-owned business and is headed by the Wright family.

History

1950s-1960s
Midwest Communications began in Wausau, Wisconsin, with WRIG, Inc. and the acquisition by the Duey E. Wright family of a 1400 kHz, 250 watt AM facility from the Wisconsin Valley Television Corporation. The call letters WRIG (for Wright) were assigned and on August 1, 1958, top forty-formatted WRIG signed on the air. Power was increased to 1,000 watts in 1961 and WRIG-FM (now WDEZ) signed on in 1964.

1970s
Midwest started station WROE in Appleton/Oshkosh, Wisconsin in 1971. Founder Duey E. Wright Sr. died at 75 on November 24, 1971, with Duey E. Wright Jr. taking over the company his father founded. In 1975 Midwest purchased WBAY-AM and FM, Green Bay, Wisconsin. Due to FCC rules at that time, WROE was sold. The Green Bay call letters were changed to WGEE-AM (now WTAQ-AM) and WIXX-FM. The 1980s saw the acquisition by Midwest of KIOA/KMGK, Des Moines, Iowa, WKKQ/WTBX, Hibbing, Minnesota and KLMS/KFMQ, Lincoln, Nebraska. In addition WRIG moved to 1390 kHz and increased power to 5000 watts day and night.

1990s
The Telecommunications Act of 1996 allowed Midwest to consolidate the Green Bay-Appleton/Oshkosh and Wausau-Stevens Point markets. The consolidation brought about the sale of the Des Moines, Lincoln and Hibbing stations and the acquisitions of WROE, WOZZ, WLTM (now WZBY), WNCY and WNFL in Green Bay-Appleton/Oshkosh and WSAU, WIFC, WOFM and WIZD in Wausau-Stevens Point. In addition four stations WTVB, WNWN AM/FM and WFAT were acquired in the Kalamazoo-Battle Creek, Michigan market.

2000s
In the beginning of the 2000s, Midwest acquired WHBL, WWJR (now WHBZ) and WBFM IN Sheboygan, Wisconsin and WHTC and WEVS (now WYVN) in Holland, Michigan as well as the Duluth Minnesota/Superior Wisconsin market stations KDAL AM/FM, KRBR, WDSM, KTCO and KXTP (now WGEE).

On June 30, 2004, Midwest Communications, Inc. acquired an additional six stations in the Hibbing Minnesota market, WNMT, WMFG AM/FM, KMFG, WTBX and WUSZ.

On June 14, 2005 Midwest Communications, Inc. acquired WMGI and WWSY in Terre Haute, Indiana and on December 16, 2005 added WACF and WPRS licensed to Paris, IL to the Terre Haute Indiana market.

On January 6, 2006 Midwest Communications, Inc. expanded in the Sheboygan Wisconsin market with the addition of WXER.

On May 1, 2006 Midwest Communications, Inc. acquired three additional properties in the Kalamazoo, Michigan market, WKZO, WQLR (now WVFM) and WQSN (now WQLR).

2010s
The company continued to grow when Midwest Communications added stations in the Lansing market. 94.1 FM WVIC, 106.1 FM WJXQ, 92.1 FM WQTX and 92.9 FM WLMI joined the Midwest Communications family in July 2010.

On November 1, 2012, Midwest Communications acquired six additional radio stations in Sioux Falls, South Dakota. Those stations included 103.7 FM KRRO, 95.7 FM KQSF, 92.5 FM KTWB, 101.9 FM KELO-FM, 1320 AM KELO-AM and 1230 AM KWSN.

May 1, 2013 saw the acquisition of six more radio properties in Fargo, North Dakota. 101.9 FM KRWK, 104.7 FM KMJO, 93.7 FM WDAY, 740 AM KVOX, 99.9 FM KVOX and 790 AM KFGO “The Mighty 790”.

On September 1, 2014, Midwest Communications expanded to three new markets with the acquisition of stations in the Nashville, Tennessee, Knoxville, Tennessee and Evansville, Indiana markets. In this acquisition Midwest added nine more radio properties. In Nashville, Tennessee, Midwest acquired 96.3 FM WCJK and 92.9 FM WJXA. In Knoxville, Tennessee, 103.5 FM WIMZ, 97.5 FM WJXB and 95.7 FM WVRX. The Evansville, Indiana stations include 93.5 FM WLFW, 107.5 FM WABX, 96.1 FM WSTO and 104.1 FM WIKY.

On December 30, 2016, Midwest sold Hibbing, Minnesota-based KMFG to Refuge Media Group. On December 31, 2016, Midwest acquired KAOD, KGPZ, KQDS-FM, WEVE-FM, and WXXZ in the Duluth and Hibbing markets from Red Rock Broadcasting.

Effective September 22, 2017, Midwest sold WXXZ and KAOD to Aurora Broadcasting, L.L.C.

List of stations

Battle Creek, Michigan
 WNWN - 98.5 FM -  Country music
 WFAT - 930 AM/102.7 FM - Classic hits

Coldwater, Michigan
 WTVB - 1590 AM/95.5 FM  Classic Hits

Duluth, Minnesota
 KDAL - 610 AM/103.9 FM - News Talk
 KDAL-FM - 95.7 FM - Adult contemporary
 KDKE - 102.5 FM - Classic Country
 KTCO - 98.9 FM - Country music
 KQDS-FM - 94.9 FM - Classic rock
 WDSM - 710 AM - Sports radio
 WDUL - 970 AM/98.1 FM - Top 40

Evansville, Indiana
 WABX - 107.5 FM - Classic rock
 WIKY-FM - 104.1 FM - Adult Contemporary
 WLYD - 93.5 FM - Country
 WSTO - 96.1 FM - CHR/Top 40

Fargo, North Dakota
 KFGO - 790 AM/94.1 FM - News Talk
 KFGO-FM - 104.7 FM - News Talk
 KNFL - 740 AM/107.3 FM - Sports
 KOYY - 93.7 FM - Top 40 (CHR)
 KRWK - 101.9 FM - Adult Hits
 KVOX-FM - 99.9 FM - Country

Green Bay, Wisconsin
 WGEE - 93.1 FM/93.1 FM - Classic Country
 WDKF - 99.7 FM - Classic Country
 WIXX -101.1 FM - Top 40/CHR
 WNCY-FM - 100.3 FM/92.1 FM - Country music
 WNFL - 1440 AM - Sports Radio
 WTAQ - 1360 AM - Conservative Talk
 WTAQ-FM - 97.5 FM - News Talk
 WYDR - 94.3 FM - Adult Hits

Hibbing, Minnesota
 WMFG - 1240 AM - Adult Standards
 WMFG-FM - 106.3 FM - Classic Rock (KQDS-FM simulcast)
 WNMT - 650 AM - News Talk
 WTBX - 93.9 FM - Hot AC
 WDKE - 96.1 FM/98.3 FM/103.9 FM - Classic Country
 WEVE-FM - 97.9 FM/92.1 FM - Adult Contemporary
 WUSZ - 99.9 FM - Country music

Holland, Michigan
 WHTC - 1450 AM/99.7 FM - News Talk
 WYVN - 92.7 FM - Classic Hits

Jackson, Michigan
 WWDK - 94.1 FM - Classic country

Kalamazoo, Michigan
 WKZO - 590 AM/106.9 FM - News Talk
 WTOU - 1660 AM/95.5 FM - Urban adult contemporary
 WVFM - 106.5 FM - Adult Hits
 WZOX - 96.5 FM - Modern AC

Knoxville, Tennessee
 WDKW - 95.7 FM - Classic Country
 WIMZ-FM - 103.5 FM - Classic Rock
 WJXB-FM - 97.5 FM/107.3 FM - Adult Contemporary
 WNFZ - 94.3 FM - Adult Hits

Lansing, Michigan
 WJXQ - 106.1 FM - Rock
 WLMI - 92.9 FM - Classic Rock
 WQTX - 92.1 FM - Rhythmic Adult Contemporary

Peoria, Illinois
 WIRL - 1290 AM/95.9 FM - Conservative Talk
 WKZF - 102.3 FM - Rhythmic Classic Hits
 WMBD - 1470 AM/100.3 FM - News/Talk
 WSWT - 106.9 FM - Hot Adult Contemporary
 WPBG - 93.3 FM - Classic Hits
 WXCL - 104.9 FM - Country

Nashville, Tennessee
 WCJK - 96.3 FM - Adult Hits
 WJXA - 92.9 FM - Adult Contemporary
 WNFN - 106.7 FM - Contemporary Hit Radio

Sheboygan, Wisconsin
 WBFM - 93.7 FM - Country music
 WHBL - 1330 AM/101.5 FM News Talk
 WHBZ - 106.5 FM - Active Rock
 WXER - 104.5 FM/96.1 FM - Hot adult contemporary

Sioux Falls, South Dakota
 KELO - 1320 AM/105.1 FM - News Talk
 KELO-FM - 101.9 FM - Soft Rock
 KELQ - 107.9 FM - News/Talk
 KQSF - 95.7 FM - Top 40
 KRRO - 103.7 FM - Active Rock
 KTWB - 92.5 FM - Country music
 KWSN - 1230 AM/98.1 FM - Sports Radio

Terre Haute, Indiana
 WBOW - 102.7 FM - Classic Hits
 WIBQ - 1230 AM/97.9 FM - News/Talk
 WIBU - 1440 AM - News/Talk
 WMGI - 100.7 FM - Contemporary hit radio
 WTHI-FM - 99.9 FM - Country music
 WWVR - 98.5 FM - Classic rock

Wausau, Wisconsin
 WDEZ - 101.9 FM - Country
 WIFC - 95.5 FM - Top 40/CHR
 WOZZ - 94.7 FM/102.9 FM - Adult Hits
 WRIG - 1390 AM/93.9 FM - Sports Radio
 WSAU - 550 AM/95.1 FM - Conservative Talk
 WSAU-FM - 99.9 FM - Conservative Talk

Notable Talent
 Joel Heitkamp - talk show host

References

External links
 Corporate Website

Wausau, Wisconsin
Companies based in Wisconsin
Radio broadcasting companies of the United States
Midwest Communications radio stations